The 2018 Wake Forest Demon Deacons football team represented Wake Forest University during the 2018 NCAA Division I FBS football season. The team was led by fifth-year head coach Dave Clawson, and played their home games at BB&T Field. Wake Forest competed in the Atlantic Division of the Atlantic Coast Conference as they have since the league's inception in 1953. They finished the season 7–6, 3–5 in ACC play to finish in a tie for fifth place in the Atlantic Division. They were invited to the Birmingham Bowl where they defeated Memphis.

Previous season
The Demon Deacons finished the 2017 season 8–5, 4–4 in ACC play to finish in a three-way tie for third place in the Atlantic Division. They were invited to the Belk Bowl where they defeated Texas A&M.

Recruits

Preseason

Award watch lists
Listed in the order that they were released.

ACC media poll
The ACC media poll was released on July 24, 2018.

Schedule
Wake Forest announced their schedule for the 2018 season on January 17, 2018. The Demon Deacons' schedule consist of 7 home games and 5 away games. Wake Forest host conference opponents Boston College, Clemson, Pittsburgh, and Syracuse, and travel to Duke, Florida State, Louisville, and NC State. The Demon Deacons play out of conference games against Tulane of the AAC, Towson of the Division I FCS CAA, Notre Dame who competes as an Independent, and Rice of C-USA.

Coaching staff

Roster

Game summaries

at Tulane

Towson

Boston College

Notre Dame

Rice

Clemson

at Florida State

at Louisville

Syracuse

at NC State

Pittsburgh

at Duke

vs. Memphis (Birmingham Bowl)

2019 NFL draft

Notes

References

Wake Forest
Wake Forest Demon Deacons football seasons
Birmingham Bowl champion seasons
Wake Forest Demon Deacons football